One human poll comprised the 1938 National Collegiate Athletic Association (NCAA) football rankings. Unlike most sports, college football's governing body, the NCAA, does not bestow a national championship, instead that title is bestowed by one or more different polling agencies. There are two main weekly polls that begin in the preseason—the AP Poll and the Coaches' Poll. The Coaches' Poll began operation in 1950; in addition, the AP Poll did not begin conducting preseason polls until that same year.

Legend

AP Poll
The scheduled final AP Poll was released on November 29, with Notre Dame No. 1, prior to their season-end game against Southern California.

The poll was extended for one week due to the "select quality of last Saturday's games, three of which had a direct bearing on the ranking".

The revised final AP Poll was released on December 6, at the end of the regular season, still weeks before the major bowls. The AP would not release a post-bowl season final poll regularly until 1968.

Houlgate System

References

College football rankings